Building a Building is a 1933 American animated short film produced by Walt Disney Production and released by United Artists. A remake of the 1928 Oswald the Lucky Rabbit film Sky Scrappers, the cartoon depicts Mickey Mouse working at a construction site under the supervision of Peg-Leg Pete while Minnie Mouse is selling box lunches to the workers. It was directed by David Hand, his first directorial assignment at Disney, and features the voices of Walt Disney as Mickey, Marcellite Garner as Minnie, and Pinto Colvig as Pete. It was the 51st Mickey Mouse short film, and the first of that year.

The film was nominated for the Academy Award for Best Animated Short Film at the 6th Academy Awards, but lost to Disney's own Three Little Pigs. This was the second Mickey Mouse cartoon nominated for an Oscar.

Plot
Mickey is operating a steam shovel at a construction site. Minnie appears on a cart pulled by Pluto; she is selling box lunches to the workers.

After he uses the steam shovel to retrieve Minnie's hat (which had blown off and landed by him), Mickey accidentally throws dirt from the steam shovel onto Peg-Leg Pete (whose peg leg is on the left leg rather than the right), the foreman, causing him to get angry and shout, "HEY!!! Don't put dirt on the blueprint! What do you think you're doing?!". Mickey hurriedly brings up a load of bricks in a wheelbarrow. Meanwhile, Pete sees Minnie and flirts with her, though she is not interested. Mickey, distracted by Minnie, accidentally drops the bricks on Pete, who literally shouts out, "Hey, you blankety blank baboon!"

Finally, Mickey himself falls through Pete's blueprint. Pete has had enough and starts to strangle Mickey, but just then it is noon and an anthropomorphic steam whistle sounds for lunch. Mickey settles down to eat a fish sandwich, but it is stolen by Pete. Minnie offers to give him a box lunch for free. As Mickey is eating the lunch, Pete abducts Minnie from above with a crane.

Mickey chases after Pete, and finally wrestles with him high up on the building. Minnie grabs a pan of red-hot rivets and drops them down Pete's pants. This gives the mice enough time to run away as Pete pours water down his pants.

In the process of chasing Mickey and Minnie, Pete has an anvil fall on his head and fires rivets at them with a handheld pneumatic hammer. This turns on him when the hammer falls into his pants and gets attached to his peg leg. The mice escape down a chute riding a wheelbarrow, while Pete falls into a cement mixer and accidentally dismantles a large portion of the building.

Once he hits the ground, Pete proclaims that Mickey is fired. Mickey immediately goes into business with Minnie selling box lunches.

Reception
Piotr Borowiec said that this cartoon has better animation, stronger story lines, and better gags than the previous ones. Studio art instructor Don Graham taught a class in which students studied live-action films and compared them to Disney cartoons. In the class, the students compared Elmer Elephant and this cartoon. The students said that Building a Building was better. Michael Barrier disagreed about their decision, but he said that the students did have a point.

Voice cast
 Mickey Mouse: Walt Disney
 Minnie Mouse: Marcellite Garner
 Pegleg Pete: Pinto Colvig
 Crane: ???

Home media
The short was released on December 2, 2002, on Walt Disney Treasures: Mickey Mouse in Black and White.

In popular culture
 Building a Building is an area in the Timeless River world in the 2005 video game Kingdom Hearts II. Other shorts that are featured as areas of that world are Steamboat Willie, Gulliver Mickey, The Fire Fighters and Mickey's Orphans.
 The steam shovel Mickey pilots in this short reappeared in the 2010 video game Epic Mickey during the Mickeyjunk Mountain level, while the short itself appears as a 2D level in the 2012 sequel Epic Mickey 2: The Power of Two.

See also
 Mickey Mouse (film series)

References

1933 films
1930s color films
1933 animated films
1930s Disney animated short films
Mickey Mouse short films
Films directed by David Hand
Films produced by Walt Disney
American black-and-white films
1933 short films
1930s English-language films